Rhadinomyia conjuncta is a species of ulidiid or picture-winged fly in the genus Rhadinomyia of the family Ulidiidae.

References

Ulidiidae